Tamaz (Thomas) Valerianis dze Gamkrelidze (Georgian: თამაზ ვალერიანის ძე გამყრელიძე, 23 October 1929 – 10 February 2021) was a Georgian linguist, orientalist public benefactor and Hittitologist, Academic (since 1974) and President (2005–2013) of the Georgian Academy of Sciences (GAS), Doctor of Sciences (1963), Professor (1964).

Biography 
Gamkrelidze was born in Kutaisi, Georgian SSR. His brother Revaz Gamkrelidze is also an Academic, a famous mathematician.

Tamaz Gamkrelidze graduated from the Faculty of Oriental Studies of the Tbilisi State University (TSU) in 1952. Since 1964 Gamkrelidze was a professor of this university, and since 1966 the Head of the Chair of Structural and Applied Linguistics. In 1973–2006 he was a Director of the Tsereteli Institute of Oriental Studies (Tbilisi). He was the author of many outstanding works in the fields of Indo-European linguistics, Ancient languages, Theoretical linguistics, Structural and Applied Linguistics and Kartvelology. He was a leading proponent of the glottalic theory of Proto-Indo-European consonants.

In the 1980s Gamkrelidze worked with Vyacheslav Ivanov on a new theory of Indo-European migrations, which was most recently advocated by them in Indo-European and Indo-Europeans (1995).

In 1988–1995 he edited the premier linguistics journal of the Russian Academy of Science "Voprosy jazykoznanija". He was a Foreign Associate of the United States National Academy of Sciences (2006), Foreign Honorary Member of the American Academy of Arts & Sciences, Corresponding Fellow of the British Academy, Fellow of the European Society of Linguistics (in 1986-1988 President of this Society), Corresponding Member of the Austrian Academy of Sciences, Academician of the Russian Academy of Science, a Fellow of the World Academy of Art and Science (2006), Doctor honoris causa of the Bonn University (Germany) and the University of Chicago (U.S.), Honorary Member of the Linguistic Society of America, etc. He has received the Lenin Prize (1988), the Humboldt International Prize (1989) and the Ivane Javakhishvili Prize of the Georgian Academy of Sciences (1992). From 1992 to 2005 Gamkrelidze was a member of the Parliament of Georgia.

In August 1991 Tamaz Gamkrelidze was appointed the Rector of the Tbilisi State University, however, he stayed on this post for a very short time.

Since 2000, he was an honorary citizen of Tbilisi.

Gamkrelidze died on 10 February 2021, aged 91.

Selected bibliography 
 “The Akkado-Hittite syllabary and the problem of the origin of the Hittite script”, Archiv Orientální, vol. 29 (1960).
 Anatolian languages and the problem of Indo-European migration to Asia Minor, Studies in General and Oriental Linguistics. Tokyo, 1970
 with V. V. Ivanov, Indoevropjskij jazyk i indoevropejcy: Rekonstrukcija i istoriko-tipologieskij analiz prajazyka i protokultury. Tiflis: Tiflis University Press 1984. xcvi + 1328 p.
 English translation: Indo-European and the Indo-Europeans: A reconstruction and historical analysis of a proto-language and a proto-culture. 2 vols. Trans. J. Nichols. Berlin–New York: Mouton de Gruyter, 1: 1994, 2: 1995.
 with V. V. Ivanov, “The ancient Near East and the Indo-European question: Temporal and territorial characteristics of Proto-Indo-European based on linguistic and historico-cultural data”, Soviet Studies in History vol. 22, no. 1–2 (1983): 7–52. doi: 10.2753/RSH1061-19832201027
 with V. V. Ivanov, “The migrations of tribes speaking Indo-European dialects from their original homeland in the Near East to their historical habitations in Eurasia”, Soviet Studies in History vol. 22, no. 1–2 (1983): 53–95. doi: 10.2753/RSH1061-198322010253
 “Proto-Indo-European as a Stative-Active Typology”, in Indogermanica et Caucasica: Festschrift für Karl Horst Schmidt zum 65. Geburtstag, eds. Roland Bielmeier & Reinhard Stempel. Berlin–NY: Mouton de Gruyter, 1994, pp. 25–34.
 Alphabetic writing and the old Georgian script. New York: Caravan Books, 1994.
 Ivo Hajnal, ed. Thomas V. Gamkrelidze, Selected writings: Linguistic sign, typology and language reconstruction. Innsbruck 2006.

See also 
 Georgian Academy of Sciences
 Glottalic theory

References

External links 
 Home Page of Tamaz Gamkrelidze (2015-07-05 not accessible)
 Georgian Academy of Sciences (GAS)
 Tbilisi State University

 

1929 births
2021 deaths
Linguists from Georgia (country)
Scientists from Georgia (country)
Hittitologists
Indo-Europeanists
Linguists of Indo-European languages
People from Kutaisi
Full Members of the USSR Academy of Sciences
Full Members of the Russian Academy of Sciences
Kartvelian studies scholars
Orientalists from Georgia (country)
Members of the Georgian National Academy of Sciences
Lenin Prize winners
Rectors of Tbilisi State University
Corresponding Fellows of the British Academy
Foreign associates of the National Academy of Sciences
Honoured Scientists of Georgia (country)